Pêro Dias (15th century) was a Portuguese explorer of the African coast. He accompanied his brother Bartolomeu Dias and Diogo Dias on his journey around the Cape of Good Hope in 1487/1488, having commanded the supply with his brother Diogo Dias. His voyage's original goal, however was only to reach the Cape of Good Hope as opposed to round it; however, when his ship was caught in a storm, they were blown around the Cape to the east side of Africa. Feeling they had already gone far enough, they returned to Europe. 

Portuguese explorers
15th-century explorers of Africa
Maritime history of Portugal
15th-century Portuguese people
15th-century births
Year of death unknown